Canadian singer and songwriter Tamia has released nine albums (including seven studio albums, one extended play, and one compilation albums), and twenty-six singles (including four as a featured artist and one charity singles). She began her career in 1995 as a protégé of musician Quincy Jones, who offered her the chance to appear on his album Q's Jook Joint (1995). Selected as the album's first single, their collaboration "You Put a Move on My Heart" became a top 20 success on the US Billboard Hot R&B/Hip-Hop Songs. The song,  along with their second collaboration "Slow Jams" and "Missing You", a song she recorded with Brandy, Gladys Knight, and Chaka Khan for the soundtrack of the 1996 motion picture Set It Off, was later nominated for a Grammy Award.

Signed to Jones's Qwest Records, Tamia's self-titled debut album was released in 1998. The album took her work further into the contemporary R&B and hip hop genres but became a moderate commercial success, peaking at number sixty-seven on the US Billboard 200 chart and entered the top twenty of the Top R&B/Hip-Hop Albums chart. From the five singles that were released from the album, "Imagination" and "So into You" reached the top forty of Billboard Hot 100.  The album was certified gold in Japan in June 1998 for 100,000 copies shipped to stores. In the United States, Tamia sold 416,000 copies in total. After a transition to Elektra Records, Tamia released her second album A Nu Day in 2000. Chiefly produced by Shep Crawford and Missy Elliott, the album entered the top ten on Billboards Top R&B/Hip-Hop Albums chart. It included the singles "Can't Go for That" and "Stranger in My House," the latter of which reached number 10 on the US Billboard Hot 100, making it her highest-charting single to date. Her strongest seller yet, A Nu Day sold over 665,000 copies in the United States and was certified gold by the Recording Industry Association of America (RIAA).

Tamia released her long-delayed third album, More, following her diagnosis with multiple sclerosis in mid-2004. Pushed by the top five success of "Into You", an updated version of her 1998 single "So into You", which rapper Fabolous recorded for his album Street Dreams, More became her highest-charting album yet, debuting and peaking at number 17 on Billboard 200. The album spawned three singles. Feeling restricted by record label obligations, Tamia later split from Elektra to go independent with her own company, Plus One Music Group. Her first project with the label was Between Friends. Her second album with the rooster, Beautiful Surprise, was released in 2012 after a nearly six-year absence in which she had devoted herself to the education of her two children with retired basketball player Grant Hill. It debuted at number six on the Top R&B/Hip-Hop Albums chart and also garnered two Grammy Award nominations. In 2014, Tamia entered a joint venture with Def Jam Recordings to release her sixth album Love Life. Released in June 2015, it debuted at number 24 on the US Billboard 200, while reaching the top of Billboards Top R&B Albums chart and number two on the Top R&B/Hip-Hop Albums chart, becoming her highest-charting album ever on both charts. Passion Like Fire, her seventh studio album, was released in September 2018.

Albums

Studio albums

Compilation albums

EPs

Singles

As lead artist

As featured artist

Appearances

Albums

Soundtracks

Music video

See also
List of songs recorded by Tamia

Notes

References

External links
 
 

Discographies of Canadian artists
Rhythm and blues discographies
Soul music discographies